Amber Bondin (born 26 May 1991), also known as simply Amber, is a Maltese singer. The dynamic vocal tone of Maltese born performer Amber became widely recognized following her representation of Malta in the 2015 Eurovision Song Contest. Since scooping the maximum 12 points Amber has continued to develop her unique style and sound. Amber has taken to the stage across Europe performing at sell out shows in the UK, Austria, Malta and Russia whilst duetting with names such as Joseph Calleja alongside Ronan Keating, Gigi D’Alessio as well as Suor Cristina, winner of 'The Voice Italy' 2014.

In 2015 Amber performed during the CHOGM opening ceremony held in Malta, in front of all the commonwealth heads of states including Queen Elizabeth II and Prince Charles. Amber was invited to perform for a sell-out audience at the Isle of MTV concert alongside Wiz Khalifa, Jess Glynne, Clean Bandit, Steve Aoki amongst others. Following this she went on to top the iTunes and local radio charts with hit singles "Messed Up Love", "What They Say" and "Warrior". Amongst Major shows she performed, Amber also performed during 'Erba Pjazez' as part of the Valletta 18 opening ceremony. 'Redemption' was Amber's first co written album, This album blends the pop, r&b, soul and electronic genres.

Amber is also known for her roles in musicals, including the musical "Il-Hanina Madalena" and the massive hit sell out musical "Il-Kbir Ghadhu Gej" Amber is also known for hosting and co hosting various TV shows including 'Out & About' and 'Il-Kumitat', as well as co-hosting the afternoon drive radio show 'The ride Home With Dorian & Amber' on Magic Malta 91.7.

Biography

Career

Eurovision Song Contest
Due to a change in the rules and regulations for the competition announced by the Maltese broadcaster, PBS, for the first time the artist, author and composer of the winning entry were permitted to change parts of the winning song or select a new song entirely. It was later confirmed on 7 March 2015 that Amber's winning song, "Warrior" would indeed be modified, and the new version along with its music video was premièred on 9 March 2015.

Amber failed to qualify to the final and finished in 11th place out of 17 countries with a total of 43 points.

Voluntary Work

Mzungu Mission
Voluntary work is a great part of Amber's character. Amber has been exploring voluntary work since a very young age.
Amber forms part of the NGO Mzungu Mission. She currently presides the NGO. Mzungu Mission was officially formed in 2018, however their first voluntary work dates back in 2012. Since then, Mzungu has had project in Tanzania, Rwanda, Kenya and India.

Mzungu /(ə)mˈzʊnɡʊ/: deriving from the Swahli word: mzungu; meaning "a white person".

Discography

Singles

See also
Malta in the Eurovision Song Contest 2015

References

1991 births
Eurovision Song Contest entrants of 2015
Living people
Eurovision Song Contest entrants for Malta
21st-century Maltese women singers
21st-century Maltese singers
Maltese pop singers